"Viðrar vel til loftárása" (Icelandic for "it's good weather for airstrikes"; pronounced ) is a song written and recorded by Icelandic post-rock band Sigur Rós for their second studio album Ágætis byrjun. The song appears as the seventh track on the album. It was also released as the B-side of Sigur Rós' debut single "Svefn-g-englar".

Background
The band named the song after a quote sarcastically spoken by an Icelandic weatherman during the war in Kosovo: "í dag viðrar vel til loftárása" (meaning "today is good weather for an airstrike").

Music video
"Viðrar vel til loftárása" spawned a cinematic music video. Set in 1950s Iceland, it features a football match between two teams of young boys. As one team scores a goal and celebrates, two young boys on the same team begin to kiss. The kiss is eventually broken up by the boys' fathers. All band members appear in cameo in the video: Jónsi is the soccer team coach, Orri is the scorekeeper, Georg is the referee, and Kjartan is one of the spectators. Moreover, the fetus design from the Ágætis byrjun album cover is shown on a bottle from which one of the boys drinks.

Production for the music video began in the autumn of 2001. A general casting call was held in the city of Reykjavík, Iceland, which was also the place of principal photography.  The video was directed by Arni & Kinski, Icelandic directors Stefán Árni Þorgeirsson and Sigurður Kjartansson (Siggi Kinski). The video won an Icelandic Music Award for "Best Video" in 2002. Music magazine NME ranked the video 9th on their list of "100 Greatest Music Videos".

The idea for the video came from Sigur Rós' former drummer Ágúst Ævar Gunnarsson.

Accolades

References

Sigur Rós songs
1999 songs
LGBT-related songs
Songs written by Jónsi
Songs written by Orri Páll Dýrason
Songs written by Georg Hólm
Songs written by Kjartan Sveinsson
LGBT-related controversies in music
Obscenity controversies in music
Music video controversies